Sekolah Menengah Kebangsaan Taman Desa Tebrau also known as its acronym SMKTDT is a secondary school located in Jalan Harmonium 22, Taman Desa Tebrau, Johor, Malaysia.

History
SMK Taman Desa Tebrau was established on 2 September 2003 and started to operate on 5 January 2004. The school building has five blocks of classrooms and an administrative block, a block of laboratories, music rooms and a block for Studio Art and Life Skills and Engineering Technology as well as a prayer room facilities, and cafeteria. Other than that, the school also has a basketball court and a big field for students'  v Physical Education, it is also known as Pendidikan Jasmani in Malay language. In year 2014, a student named Rosalyn Chan Li Zhen scored 9 A+ in SPM examination, the O level. SMK Taman Desa Tebrau had host for the secondary school basketball competition in Pasir Gudang area for 3 consecutive years from 2013.

References

2004 establishments in Malaysia
Buildings and structures in Johor Bahru
Educational institutions established in 2004
Secondary schools in Malaysia
Schools in Johor